Oleksiy Varnavsky (born 6 April 1957) was a Ukrainian football coach and a player.

References

External links
 

1957 births
2008 deaths
Sportspeople from Makiivka
Soviet footballers
Ukrainian footballers
FC Shakhtar Donetsk players
SKA Kiev players
FC Mariupol players
FC Guria Lanchkhuti players
Ukrainian expatriate footballers
Expatriate footballers in Russia
FC Torpedo Zaporizhzhia players
FC Khartsyzk players
FC Zirka Kropyvnytskyi players
Ukrainian football managers
Association football midfielders
FC Shakhtar-3 Donetsk managers